Little Hills Picnic Ranch, sometimes called the "Ranch at Little Hills" or just "Little Hills" is a park in Contra Costa County, California near San Ramon. It is located at 18013 Bollinger Canyon Road and is adjacent to Las Trampas Regional Wilderness.  Managed by the East Bay Regional Parks District (EBRPD), it is classed as a "picnic park," accessible only by reservation. There are no facilities for camping.

Overview
Facilities are available for basketball, softball, tetherball, foosball, volleyball, ping pong, horseshoes, rock climbing, swimming, kayak races and trout fishing. Picnic tables and restrooms are wheelchair accessible. Parking spaces are available for disabled visitors. The California Parks Company offers catering services on request.

References 

Parks in Contra Costa County, California